Camp Campbell Gard is a YMCA camp located on  along the Great Miami River six miles (10 km) northeast of Hamilton, Ohio.  The camp is on Augspurger Road in St. Clair Township.

The camp was dedicated to the memory of a World War I airman, Charles Campbell Gard, by his father Homer Gard in 1926, six years after Charles Campbell Gard's death.  The dedication on Friday, July 1, 1926, featured remarks by former Ohio governors, James M. Cox and Charles P. Taft II, son of William Howard Taft.

As specified by Homer Gard, the camp also featured facilities for “crippled children” to make the facility accessible to the handicapped.

Noted Attendees

Robert McCloskey, who carved the camp totem pole was a famous author of children's book including Make Way for Ducklings and Lentil.

David P. Smith and his brother Tony Smith are Camp Campbell Gard Alums.  David P. Smith's name still is proudly displayed on Errol's Archer's #11.  The plaque is still displayed today.

Star women's basketball player Willa McKee has also attended several times.

References

Campbell Gard
Campbell Gard
Buildings and structures in Butler County, Ohio